Anzano del Parco is a comune (municipality) in the Province of Como in the Italian region Lombardy, located about  north of Milan and about  southeast of Como.

Anzano del Parco borders the following municipalities: Alserio, Alzate Brianza, Lurago d'Erba, Monguzzo, Orsenigo.

References

External links
 Official website

Cities and towns in Lombardy
Articles which contain graphical timelines